Sarath Babu a/l Subramaniam (9 May 1980 – 5 November 2010) was a Malaysian footballer.

Club career
Professionally, he played with Perak TKN FC in the 2003 Malaysian Premier Two, and with Perak FA for the 2009 Super League season. He was also playing at amateur level for various teams in the Perak state leagues.

Death
He was killed in an accident at Lahat, Perak on 5 November 2010.

References

External links
 Profile at Seladang dot Net

1980 births
2010 deaths
People from Perak
Malaysian footballers
Perak F.C. players
Association football midfielders
Accidental deaths in Malaysia